European Air Transport Leipzig GmbH, often shortened to EAT Leipzig or EAT-LEJ, is a German cargo airline with its head office and main hub on the grounds of Leipzig/Halle Airport in Schkeuditz. It is wholly owned by Deutsche Post and operates the group's DHL-branded parcel and express services. It also provides ad hoc charter services including livestock transport.

Overview
The company in its current form dates from a merger agreement of 10 February 2010, which involved European Air Transport N.V. Brussels. That company was incorporated by the European Air Transport Leipzig GmbH and merged with it. European Air Transport Leipzig employs around 450 pilots and 480 technical personnel. Newly hired pilots are employed by either one of the subcontractors (ACL / DHL UK) or EAT Gmbh with a Leipzig-based contract. The airline also operates a number of routes for British Airways, Iberia, Finnair, Lufthansa and Amazon.

Destinations

European Air Transport operates services to Europe, Middle East and Africa as part of the DHL Aviation network. Besides over 75 smaller "air gateways", the major operational bases of DHL Aviation in Europe are:

Fleet

Current fleet
As of June 2022, the European Air Transport Leipzig fleet consists of the following aircraft. Several smaller aircraft are operated under contract for EAT Leipzig and DHL respectively by airlines such as Swiftair and West Atlantic UK.

Former fleet

See also
List of airlines of Germany

References

External links

 Official website of DHL

Airlines of Germany
Airlines established in 2005
Cargo airlines of Germany
DHL
Association of European Airlines
Companies based in Saxony
Schkeuditz
2005 establishments in Germany